In October 2022, heavy rainfall caused floods in Balrampur, in the Indian state of Uttar Pradesh. Over 1300 villages were affected by this flood.

Impact 
More than 200 villages affected in Balrampur district such as Jagtapurwa, Panditpurwa, Johvahna, Kalandarpur, Kodari, Gangapur, Lalpur, Phagunia, Jogiya Kalan, Lalnagar, Durgapur and Shernagar.

See also 
 Floods in India

References 

Balrampur
Floods in India
Climate change in India
October 2022 events in India
2022 disasters in India
Balrampur